William Maddison (1882 – 10 June 1924) was a British sailor and Olympic Champion. He competed at the 1920 Summer Olympics in Antwerp and won a gold medal in the 7 metre class aboard the Ancora.

References

1882 births
1924 deaths
British male sailors (sport)
Sailors at the 1920 Summer Olympics – 7 Metre
Olympic sailors of Great Britain
Olympic gold medallists for Great Britain
Olympic medalists in sailing
Medalists at the 1920 Summer Olympics